Ealing London Borough Council is the local authority for the London Borough of Ealing in Greater London, England. It is a London borough council, one of 32 in the United Kingdom capital of London.

History

There have previously been a number of local authorities responsible for the Ealing area. The current local authority was first elected in 1964, a year before formally coming into its powers and prior to the creation of the London Borough of Ealing on 1 April 1965. Ealing replaced the Municipal Borough of Ealing, the Municipal Borough of Southall and the Municipal Borough of Acton.

It was envisaged that through the London Government Act 1963 Ealing as a London local authority would share power with the Greater London Council. The split of powers and functions meant that the Greater London Council was responsible for "wide area" services such as fire, ambulance, flood prevention, and refuse disposal; with the local authorities responsible for "personal" services such as social care, libraries, cemeteries and refuse collection. As an outer London borough council it has been an education authority since 1965. This arrangement lasted until 1986 when Ealing London Borough Council gained responsibility for some services that had been provided by the Greater London Council, such as waste disposal. Since 2000 the Greater London Authority has taken some responsibility for highways and planning control from the council, but within the English local government system the council remains a "most purpose" authority in terms of the available range of powers and functions.

In April 2018 it was announced that anti-abortion protesters who regularly campaign outside the Marie Stopes clinic will be prevented from doing so close to the clinic.  There will be a buffer zone between the clinic and the protesters to prevent women going into the clinic being harassed.  Ealing Council is the first council in the UK to introduce such a buffer zone.

In January 2019, the council decided to stop the smoking cessation service in the borough, to save £395,000 over the following two years, as part of its plan to deal with an overall budget gap of £57 million as a result of reduced funding.

Powers and functions
The local authority derives its powers and functions from the London Government Act 1963 and subsequent legislation, and has the powers and functions of a London borough council. It sets council tax and as a billing authority also collects precepts for Greater London Authority functions and business rates. It sets planning policies which complement Greater London Authority and national policies, and decides on almost all planning applications accordingly.  It is a local education authority  and is also responsible for council housing, social services, libraries, waste collection and disposal, traffic, and most roads and environmental health.

See also
Ealing local elections

References

External links
London Borough of Ealing website

Local authorities in London
London borough councils
Politics of the London Borough of Ealing
Leader and cabinet executives
Local education authorities in England
Billing authorities in England